Sören Meißner (born 12 February 1990) is a German swimmer.

He competed in the Team event at the 2018 European Aquatics Championships, winning the silver medal.

References

1990 births
Living people
German male swimmers
German male freestyle swimmers
European Aquatics Championships medalists in swimming
Universiade silver medalists for Germany
Universiade medalists in swimming
World Aquatics Championships medalists in open water swimming
Male long-distance swimmers
Medalists at the 2017 Summer Universiade
20th-century German people
21st-century German people